Carrick Academy is a state-run secondary school, administered by South Ayrshire Council and situated in Maybole, South Ayrshire. It serves about 550 pupils, from the town of Maybole and the villages of Dalrymple, Crosshill, Kirkmichael, Straiton, Minishant, Dunure, Dailly, Kirkoswald, Maidens, and surrounding farms. It was last inspected by Her Majesty's Inspectors in March 2015.

The school's motto is Superbe Gerimus which is Latin for "We bear it proudly". The school coat of arms is a red chevron, indicating Carrick, on a silver background, with three azure lions, representing Maybole, and a gold book and quills, illustrating the school.

The school houses are Culzean House (blue), Crossraguel House (red), and Cargill House (yellow) and also previously included Cassilis (green)

History
As both a primary and a secondary school, the school that was later to become Carrick Academy was founded in 1845. The three schools in Maybole (including the original parish school first mentioned in 1630) united under the name of Maybole Public School, which was then changed in 1891 to Maybole Ladyland School.

The school then assumed the title of Maybole Carrick Academy in 1905. The new academy moved to its current site in 1926 with the opening of the present Old Building. The New Building was added in 1974, where the school became what it is now.

Heraldry
The school badge originates from the red chevron in a silver field which is the coat of arms of Carrick. The blue lions with red claws and red tongue came from the coat of arms worn by the Bruce family. When Robert the Bruce, the Earl of Carrick, became King of Scots his title moved into the Scottish royal family and subsequently into the present royal family. Prince William is the current Earl of Carrick. Maybole is the ancient capital of Carrick which is the most southerly of the three historical divisions of Ayrshire.

The Kennedys of Cassillis, the principal land owners of Carrick and known as the "Kings of Carrick", were in the main responsible for providing a school building and the schoolmaster's salary. In the badge, the black in the quills is taken from the black cross-crosslets in this family's coat of arms.

The book is the normal symbol used to indicate a school badge. The motto Superbe Gerimus was supplied by the Latin Department and means "We bear it proudly". The colours, blue and gold, were chosen because of their association with the Kennedy family. For distinguished service at Beugé in 1421, a member of the Kennedy family was given the right to use the blue and gold colours of the royal family of France.

School Building 
The school campus has two main buildings. The old building at the front of the school was opened in 1926. All of our classrooms are fitted with interactive white boards and multi-media projectors. The Mathematics, English, Social Subjects including RME, Art and Design and Pastoral Care departments are located in the Old Building. There is also a Nail Bar as well as a Technical room. The building contains a well-resourced library, our Assembly Hall and a Wi-Fi room which enhances the ICT provision available to our young people. The new building at the back of the school was opened in 1974. It contains the following departments: Computing, Design & Technology, Science, Business Studies, Modern Languages, Music and Home Economics. The new building also contains the school administration offices, the main staffroom, the school Dining Hall and Cafeteria. The office reception area and the canteen have Carrick TV displayed so that all pupils, staff and visitors to the school can keep up-to-date with all the events taking place.

The PE facilities include a games hall, gym and a multi-use astro-turf.

Carrick Academy will move into the new community campus which is scheduled for completion in April 2023.

Notable former pupils

Robert MacBryde (1913–1966), painter and theatre designer.
Ross McCrorie (1998), professional football player.
Robby McCrorie (1998), professional football player.

Former Head Teachers
Mr White – 1956–1970 – Retired*
Mr Bell – 1970–1982 – Retired* 
Mr S Jardine – 1982–1990 – Left*
Mr M Goodwin – 1990–1997 – Left*
Mr R Stewart – 1997–2010 – Retired Early* Former DHT-1991-1997
Mr K Webster – 2010–2013 – Left for Falkirk High School
Mrs T S Stevens – 2013–2021 – Retired* notable for being the First Female Head Teacher
Mrs E McEwan – 2021 to Present, former Depute Headteacher at near-by Girvan Academy.

References

External links

Carrick Academy's page on Scottish Schools Online
 Carrick Academy on South Ayrshire Council website

Secondary schools in South Ayrshire
1845 establishments in Scotland
Educational institutions established in 1845
Maybole